The order of battle for the Union and Confederate forces at the Battle of Mobile Bay on August 5, 1864.

Union

Navy
Commander : Rear Admiral David Farragut

14 wooden ships:

  (screw sloop) — Captain James Alden
  (950-ton ironclad gunboat/screw steamer) — Lieutenant Commander Clark H. Wells
  (2900-ton screw sloop; Farragut's flagship) — Flag Captain Percival Drayton
  (gunboat) — Lieutenant Commander George Brown
  (gunboat) — Lieutenant Commander William P. McCann
  (1240-ton steam screw sloop-of-war) — Captain John B. Marchand
  (1173-ton Sassacus-class "double-ender" steam gunboat) — Lieutenant Commander James Edward Jouett
  (screw sloop) — Commander James H. Strong
  (981-ton "double-ender" side-wheel gunboat) — Lieutenant Commander Charles H. Green 
  (screw sloop) — Commander J. R. Madison Mullaney
  (1240-ton steam screw sloop) — Commander William E. Le Roy
  (sidewheel steamer gunboat "double-ender") — Lieutenant Commander Bancroft Gherardi
  (screw sloop) — Captain Thornton A. Jenkins
  (screw sloop) — Commander Edward Donaldson

4 ironclad monitors:
  (1300-ton Milwaukee-class ironclad river monitor, twin-turrets) — Lieutenant Commander George H. Perkins
  (2100-ton Canonicus-class monitor) — Commander James W. Nicholson
  (2100-ton Canonicus-class monitor) — Commander Tunis Craven (sunk by torpedo)
  (1300-ton Milwaukee-class ironclad river monitor, twin-turrets) — Commander Thomas H. Stevens, Jr.

Army
Commander : Military Division of West Mississippi — Major-General Edward R. S. Canby (not present)

Confederate

Navy
Commander: Admiral Franklin Buchanan (captured)

1 ironclad:
  (1273-ton ironclad ram; Buchanan's flagship) — Captain James D. Johnston (captured)

3 gunboats:
  (863-ton side-wheel gunboat) — Lieutenant Commander J. W. Bennett (grounded and abandoned)
  (863-ton side-wheel gunboat) — Commander George W. Harrison
  (320-ton side-wheel gunboat) — Lieutenant Peter U. Murphey (captured)

Army

References

American Civil War orders of battle